Child of Destiny is the eighteenth album by Irish folk and rebel band The Wolfe Tones.

Track list

 Child of Destiny
 Swing a Banker
 Cliffs of Moher
 Hibernia
 Uncle Nobby's Steamboat
 Siobhain
 Anne Devlin
 Moonbeams
 Celtic People
 My Green Valleys
 John O'Brien
 Champions of Champions
 The Merman
 The First of May
 Big Brother
 Who Fears to Speak of '98
 Admiral William Brown

References

External links
 Entry at discogs.com

The Wolfe Tones albums
2011 albums